The Ritz-Carlton, Hong Kong, is a five-star hotel by The Ritz-Carlton Hotel Company , and the 3rd highest hotel in the world.

It was the world's highest hotel (2011 - 2019),  currently surpassed by Rosewood Guangzhou located on the top floors of the Guangzhou CTF Finance Centre, and Heavenly Jin of J Hotel Shanghai Tower on the 120th floor at 556m above ground.

Level 
Officially, 102 to 118; actually, 92 to 108 & 4, 5, 6. 
(Based on the International Commerce Centre is a 108-storey building).

History 

Located at Central, Hong Kong from 1993 to 2008.
It reopened at International Commerce Centre for business on 29March 2011. Its interior lighting was designed by British lighting designer Sally Storey.

Features 
The  Presidential Suite is on level 117. 

A high-speed elevator takes guests to the main lobby and Café 103 on level 103 at 425m above sea level in 80 seconds from the arrival lobby on level 9.

Guest keycards are required to use the hotel elevators to access the hotel rooms on level 106 to 117.

An exclusive club lounge for guests staying in club rooms and suites is on level 116 along with the spa. And the world’s highest swimming pool, fitness centre and bar (called Ozone) are on the top level 118.

Dining (level 102) 

A Michelin restaurant "Tosca di Angelo" is presided by chef Angelo Agliano.

"The Lounge & Bar" and 2 Michelin-star Tin Lung Heen also on this level.

Events

Woman Jumps to Death from 102nd Floor 
At about 3am on August 9, 2017, a 29-year-old woman was found lying on the road at the taxi stand opposite the International Commerce Centre. After investigation, the woman was Liao Yilin, the 29-year-old daughter of Liao Rongjiu, a member of the Standing Committee of the Guangdong Political Consultative Conference. She stayed in The Ritz-Carlton, Hong Kong since August 7, 2017 until her suicide. It is suspected that the woman climbed over the fence from the fire barrier on the 102nd Floor of the Hotel and jumped. The protruding glass windows on around the 10th Floor of the building were found to be shattered. It is suspected that the woman crushed the windows as she fell.

South Korean Man Murdered Wife and Son 
In the early morning of January 14, 2018, a family of 3 South Koreans (including a 42-year-old couple and a 7-year-old son). A friend in South Korea claimed that the family was going to commit suicide. The friend called the South Korean police, who then referred the South Korean Consulate Ceneral in Hong Kong for help. The consulate contacted The Ritz-Carlton, Hong Kong to find out. Police arrived at the scene to arrest the suspect and picked up a blood-stained knife that did not belong to the Hotel. The man was drunk when he was arrested. A Hotel spokesperson responded to the incident, saying that they are deeply sympathetic to the unfortunate incident and are cooperating with the police investigation.

The man involved was remanded to the Lai Chi Kok Reception Centre after his arrest, until he was found by Correctional Services Department staff on April 16, 2018 to hang himself with a bed sheet in the cell. A week later, a judge granted permission to drop all charges.

The Murder of Aqua Chow 
Aqua Chow (周慧賢), a 23-year-old yoga instructor in Hong Kong, was originally scheduled to board a plane at 2am on June 30, 2022, to go to the United States for further studies. She disappeared after leaving her apartment with her ex-boyfriend in the afternoon of June 29. Her 28-year-old ex-boyfriend Alex Lo surrendered to the police on June 30. The police later found a female bodyx in The Ritz-Carlton, Hong Kong. The deceased was found heavily wounded in a bloody bathtub with more than 30 knife stabs.

Gallery

See also

 Architecture of Hong Kong
 List of hotels in Hong Kong
 List of tallest hotels in the world
 List of tallest voluntarily demolished buildings
 Sky100, a 360-degree indoor observation deck on the 100th floor of the International Commerce Centre

References

External link
1. Official website

2011 establishments in Hong Kong
Hotel buildings completed in 2011
Hotels established in 2011
Hong Kong
Skyscraper hotels in Hong Kong
Sun Hung Kai Properties
West Kowloon